Route 386 is a road in Israel that runs from Tzur Hadassah to Jerusalem.

Route

The route begins as a two-lane undivided road in the Judean Mountains at 730 meters above sea level at Tzur Hadassah Junction with Route 375. It travels west-northwest for 2 km. passing Moshav Bar Giora and Nes Harim Junction with Road 3866 where it turns eastward for 1.2 km. and negotiates a hairpin turn. The road then begins a long winding descent, first west, then north, then east, skirting around the west side of the Har Giora Nature Reserve offering scenic views as it descends into the Sorek Valley. At its lowest point of 550 meters, the road passes Jerusalem's largest sewage treatment facility (Sorek).

It then begins a slow northeasterly ascent as it passes Jerusalem's main electrical substation (Sapir Station) and the Sataf Spring Nature Reserve. Turning more easterly, it enters Jerusalem just before passing below Hadassah Hospital and intersects with Route 395 at Kerem Junction. It continues its ascent via Ein Kerem Street through the neighborhood of Ein Kerem travelling southeast, then north, then east until Holland Square adjacent to the Bayit VeGan neighborhood. From this point, Route 386 becomes a boulevard with traffic light controlled intersections.

The road continues northeasterly as Sderot Herzl (Herzl Boulevard), also known as Tzir Herzl (Herzl Axis), the major north-south route on the west side of the city. Along this portion of the route, tracks were laid for the Jerusalem Light Rail, which began operation in August 2011. The road passes Yad Vashem, the Mount Herzl National Cemetery and Sha'arei Tzedek Medical Center. Between Molikovsky Square at Shmuel Beyth Street and Haft Square at HeHalutz Street, northbound traffic may continue through Beit HaKerem along Herzl Boulevard. Southbound traffic, however, is shunted 0.2 km. west along the parallel Mordechai Ish Shalom Street.

After Haft Square, the road travels between the neighborhoods of Kiryat Moshe and Kiryat HaLeom, passing nearby the Kiryat Moshe Interchange of Highway 50 (Begin Expressway). It ends at 800 meters above sea level at Shazar Boulevard at the main western entrance to Jerusalem at the base of the Jerusalem Chords Bridge and the Binyanei HaUma Convention Center.

Junctions

References

386
386